Mount Hood Skibowl is a recreation area on Mount Hood located near Government Camp, Oregon. The area is also popular for summer recreation with mountain biking. An adventure park in the area includes alpine slides, zip-line, and bungee jumping. As well as other outdoor activities. Just across the highway is Government Camp, the focal point of Mount Hood.

Skibowl is owned by Kirk Hanna. Hanna purchased Skibowl in 1987 and has made many changes since purchasing the resort.

Mountain statistics 
 Average Annual Snowfall: Approx. 300 inches
 Average Annual Base: 5-10 feet
 America’s largest night-ski area
 Average season length: 4 months, weather depending (Early December – Early April)

Elevation 
 Summit: 5,066 feet at Tom Dick and Harry Mountain
 Base: 3,600 feet
 Vertical drop: ~1,500 feet

Trails 
 Skiable Area: 960 acres including 300 acre outback area.
 Total Runs: 65
 Beginner runs: 20%
 Intermediate runs: 40%
 Expert runs: 40%
 Longest run: 3 miles (Skyline trail)
 Terrain parks: 3
 Jesse’s Flight Terrain Park
 Govyville Terrain Park
 West Rope Tow Terrain Park

Trail Map

Lift Information

SkiBowl Chairlift Information

History 
Mount Hood Skibowl began as two separate resorts, Skibowl and Multorpor. In 1928, Everett Sickler developed Jump Hill on Multorpor Mountain. The following year, the Cascade Ski Club began holding competitions on the hill, which brought national recognition after hosting a National Ski Association event. By 1938, Raymond Hughes had built the first tow rope on Multorpor on what is now the ski run named, Raceway. The current lodge on Multorpor was built by George Butler in 1949.

1937 marked the opening of the Warming Hut on Skibowl and the opening of the mountain’s first rope tow that was installed by Boyd French. In 1946, "Sandy" Sandberg installed the first chair lift that connected the lower mountain to the original Upper Bowl tow rope.

Multorpor and Skibowl are joined 
The two resorts came together in 1964 when Carl Reynolds and Everett Darr bought Skibowl. The area is collectively known as Skibowl while the resort at Multorpor Mountain is now Skibowl East.

Kirk Hanna purchase 
In 1987, Kirk Hanna purchased Skibowl out of bankruptcy and began making improvements to the resort. Hanna added 300 acres, expanded the runs that are lit for night skiing, and cut the Olympic Certified, Reynolds Run. Summer activities were also expanded with the addition of mountain biking, go-karts, and miniature golf.

Gallery

References

External links 
 Skibowl website

Buildings and structures in Clackamas County, Oregon
Ski areas and resorts in Oregon
Mount Hood
Tourist attractions in Clackamas County, Oregon
Geography of Clackamas County, Oregon